Linwood Lake may refer to:

Linwood Lake (Anoka County, Minnesota), a lake
Linwood Lake, Saint Louis County, Minnesota, an unorganized territory